Won Wron was a railway station on the Woodside railway line in Victoria, Australia, and opened in December 1921.

References

Disused railway stations in Victoria (Australia)
Transport in Gippsland (region)
Shire of Wellington